Stanley Frederick Webb (born 3 February 1946) is an English musician who is the frontman and lead guitarist with the blues band Chicken Shack.

Career
Webb was born in Fulham, South West London.  Initially playing in skiffle bands, Webb formed the first version of the blues band Chicken Shack with bassist Andy Silvester in 1965. The band played in Hamburg, Germany over the next couple of years. They signed to the Blue Horizon record label in 1967, where their label mates were the fledgling Fleetwood Mac. The group was then composed of Webb, Christine Perfect, drummer Dave Bidwell, and bassist Andy Silvester. Bidwell and Silvester would later become the rhythm section of the British blues ensemble, Savoy Brown. Webb also joined Savoy Brown for their album Boogie Brothers. Perfect later joined Fleetwood Mac becoming Christine McVie after her marriage to the band's bassist, John McVie.

Chicken Shack enjoyed their heyday in the mid to late 1960s, when R&B was popular in England. Chicken Shack's line-up has evolved over the years, with Webb being the only constant. Their music was traditional in make-up, and the group covered a variety of American blues standards, as well as composing their own songs. Their repertoire included  "I'd Rather Go Blind" by Ellington Jordan and Billy Foster. Christine Perfect was the lead singer. This song was originally recorded by Etta James.

In 2001, Webb released his first solo album in over eight years when Webb appeared on the Indigo Records label.

References

External links
 
 Knights In Blue Denim – Index Of British Blues

1946 births
English blues guitarists
English male guitarists
Living people
People from Fulham
British rhythm and blues boom musicians
British rhythm and blues musicians
Savoy Brown members
Chicken Shack members